Jeopardy! is an American media franchise that began with a television quiz show created by Merv Griffin, in which contestants are presented with clues in the form of answers, and must phrase their responses in the form of a question. Over the years, the show has expanded its brand beyond television and been licensed into products of various formats.

Television 

Jeopardy! originated as an American television series on March 30, 1964. In its original daytime format, it ran until 1975 on NBC, then was revived by the same network for a 21-week run (with a slightly different format) from 1978 to 1979. Art Fleming hosted the program during its entire run on NBC. The current version of Jeopardy! debuted in first-run syndication in September 1984 with Alex Trebek as the second host. It followed the same basic format as the NBC version, with larger prize money and a futuristic set.

With the exception of a 39-episode block of weekly shows placed into syndication near the end of the first NBC run in 1974 and 1975, Jeopardy! has aired its first-run episodes five days a week throughout its existence.

Various international versions have been produced for countries other than the United States. With the exception of the Australian, British, Italian and Japanese versions, all of these began during the current syndicated run in the U.S.

Books
In 1990, host Alex Trebek co-authored The Jeopardy! Book along with Peter Barsocchini, which included boards from some of their past tournament games as well as boards specializing in some of the show's various categories. Also included are behind-the-scenes photos of how the show is produced, including writing the game material. (Trebek also voiced the audiobook, which featured the "behind the scenes" material on tape one, and audio versions of select games from the book on tape two.) Its sequel The Jeopardy! Challenge, also co-authored by Trebek, along with Griffin, included boards from their past tournament games, and was published in 1992.

In 2000, the show's writers released 4 volumes of quiz books titled Jeopardy!: What is Quiz Book 1–4?, each featuring more than 300 pages worth of Jeopardy! boards from Seasons 14–17.

In 2004, Barnes & Noble published This is Jeopardy!: Celebrating America's Favorite Quiz Show, in honor of the show's 20th anniversary. Written by Ray Richmond, it featured selected Final Jeopardy! answers and questions from each of the show's first 20 seasons, plus trivia and other notable facts about the show. The book was released prior to Ken Jennings' run on the show.

The Jeopardy! Book of Answers was released in 2018 in honor of the show's 35th anniversary. Written by executive producer Harry Friedman, it highlighted the show's premiere (September 10, 1984), Ken Jennings' first and last games (June 2, 2004 and November 30, 2004, respectively), the 2009–2010 Million Dollar Celebrity Invitational finals (May 6–7, 2010), the IBM Challenge (February 14–16, 2011), the Battle of the Decades finals (May 15–16, 2014), the Season 33 College Championship finals (February 23–24, 2017), the Season 33 Teachers Tournament finals (May 18–19, 2017), and the Season 34 Tournament of Champions finals (November 16–17, 2017).

A number of unauthorized books have been published about Jeopardy!, written by people with ties to the show: Inside Jeopardy!: What Really Goes on at TV's Top Quiz Show (1993), written by former Jeopardy! writer and producer Harry Eisenberg, was reissued in 1995 as Jeopardy!: A Revealing Look Inside TV's Top Quiz Show with several allegations of scandal removed; Secrets of the Jeopardy! Champions (1992), written by Tournament of Champions winners Chuck Forrest and Mark Lowenthal, and How to Get on Jeopardy! and Win! (1998), written by Tournament of Champions winner Michael Dupée, serve as preparation aids for the Jeopardy! contestant hopeful; and Brainiac: Adventures in the Curious, Competitive, Compulsive World of Trivia Buffs (2006), by 74-game winner Ken Jennings and Prisoner of Trebekistan: A Decade in Jeopardy! (2006), written by comedian and former contestant Bob Harris, provide the insights of the extensive Jeopardy! experiences of two other notable champions who subsequently became authors of several books each.

Board games 
The earliest board games based on Jeopardy! were produced by Milton Bradley, which produced thirteen such games throughout the course of the original Fleming version's run (issued annually from 1964 through 1976); these games were numbered 1–12 and 14, skipping 13.

The Trebek version has also seen various board game adaptations of its own. Pressman Toy Corporation first marketed several versions in the mid-to-late 1980s, including a version with electric signal devices and scoring consoles released in 1987, a "junior" edition (with questions for children ages 8–12) and a "25th Anniversary Edition" to mark the anniversary of the original Art Fleming version debut; the latter had special games featuring questions relating to the 1960s, in addition to new questions. Later versions were produced in the early 2000s, including a standard version, a version themed after The Simpsons, and most recently, an ESPN-branded sports version (in both standard and "travel folio" variants) which, like the 1987 version before it, features an electronic buzz-in console. Tyco Toys and Parker Brothers have also manufactured their own board game adaptations of the Trebek version of Jeopardy!

In both the Milton Bradley and Pressman versions, each game (a full Jeopardy! and Double Jeopardy! round) had five categories each; the host designated one of the Double Jeopardy! questions as "Final Jeopardy." The game played identically to the show otherwise.

Video games 
Jeopardy! has been adapted into a number of video games released on various consoles and handhelds spanning multiple hardware generations. Most Jeopardy! games released prior to 1998 were published by GameTek, which filed for Chapter 11 bankruptcy protection that year.

Consoles 
An Atari 2600 adaptation of Jeopardy! was planned by The Great Game Co. in 1983, but that game ended up being cancelled during development. This would have been the only video game based on the Fleming version if it were released. No ROMs have been found.

Then, from 1987 to 1990, Rare developed a series of three Jeopardy! games for the Nintendo Entertainment System. The first featured general knowledge questions, the second was a "Kids Edition" featuring easier questions and child contestants, and the third was an "Anniversary Edition" honoring the 25th anniversary of the original Art Fleming version's debut. The Super Jeopardy! specials were also given a video game adaptation of their own for the NES, titled Talking Super Jeopardy! because of its periodic use of voice synthesis. Entertainment Weekly gave the game a C.

In 1992, GameTek released Jeopardy! video games for the Super NES and the Genesis. These two games were followed up by "Sports Editions" and "Deluxe Editions" in 1994. Of the "Sports Editions" in particular, Computer Gaming World said that despite their "many flaws", they "[exuded] a certain degree of charm" in emulating the positive and negative aspects of the television show. Later in 1994, Sony Imagesoft created a game based on the show for the Sega CD, while Philips Interactive Media released a version for its CD-i console the following year, with clues being read by Wheel of Fortune announcer Charlie O'Donnell instead of Alex Trebek. GameTek's last Jeopardy! video game before its bankruptcy was released in 1998 for the Nintendo 64. It received negative reviews which slammed the graphics (particularly the absence of animation on the contestants) and the frequent recycling of questions. According to Gametek, the latter issue results from the fact that the game loses track of which questions have already been used every time the Nintendo 64 is powered off.

Hasbro Interactive produced two Jeopardy! video game adaptations of its own for Sony Computer Entertainment's PlayStation console in 1998 and 1999; both versions feature clues that are read by announcer Johnny Gilbert instead of host Alex Trebek; while the second edition features behind-the-scenes interviews, an all-access backstage video, and a qualifying exam for contestants. Afterwards, Hasbro Interactive's successor, Infogrames Entertainment (which would later go on to become Atari, SA), released a PlayStation 2 edition in October 2003. Then in 2008, Sony Online Entertainment created a Jeopardy! game for the PlayStation 3 through the PlayStation Network.

On November 2, 2010, THQ released Jeopardy! video games for the Wii and Nintendo DS platforms. The company followed those up in 2012 by releasing games based on the show for the PlayStation 3, the Wii U, and Microsoft's Xbox 360.

On November 6, 2017, Ubisoft released America's Greatest Game Shows that include both Wheel of Fortune and Jeopardy! for Nintendo Switch, PlayStation 4/5, and XBOX One/Series X/S. However, the female host takes over Alex Trebek (before his death in 2020).

Handhelds 
A Game Boy version of Jeopardy! was released by GameTek in 1991, and went on to spawn a "Sports Edition." Both versions were ported to the Game Boy's Sega rival, the Game Gear. The gameplay in the Sports Edition is identical to the Super NES and Genesis versions, though the portable versions lack the digitized voice and image of Alex Trebek and support only two players (where the console versions support three). Tiger Electronics also released several Jeopardy! electronic games of its own, including a version for its Game.com system. In 2004, Majesco Entertainment planned a port of Jeopardy! for Game Boy Color, but those plans failed to materialize because the handheld had been discontinued by then.

In 2010, Sony Pictures Television, the show's production company, released an adaptation for the iPhone, iPod Touch, and iPad. The system was updated in 2012 with a number of online and local multiplayer modes.

In May 18, 2017, Sony Pictures Television once again released another adaptation, this time called as the Jeopardy! World Tour, for free on iOS and Android devices.

Other games 
Personal computers have seen many different adaptations of Jeopardy! The earliest was released in 1987 by Sharedata, which also released versions for the Apple II and the Commodore 64. Sony Imagesoft later released its own PC version in 1994, along with the Sega CD version. In 1998, shortly after GameTek's closure, Hasbro Interactive created a PC edition of Jeopardy!, which was followed up by a version for Macintosh computers developed by MacSoft in 2000, and later by an updated version published by Infogrames in 2003. The show's latest PC adaptation was a "Super Deluxe" edition released by Encore, Inc. in 2008.

In April 2011, GSN's interactive division teamed up with Sony Pictures Consumer Products to develop a Jeopardy! online game for Facebook, but that game has since been taken down. As of March 2013, video game adaptations of Jeopardy! also exist on Twitter, Android, and the Roku Channel Store.

Classroom Jeopardy! 
In 2002, in response to educators praising the longevity of the show's popularity and their students creating their own versions of the game to encourage student participation in class, educational toy company Educational Insights (which markets the GeoSafari system) released Classroom Jeopardy!, a self-contained, programmable game system based on Jeopardy! designed for use in schools. With this system, the teacher plays the role of host, while students can play the game on a normal classroom television set or an interactive whiteboard. Teachers are permitted to either use standardized games created for the grade levels of their classes, or write customized games of their own covering material that they are teaching at the moment. Originally, the game used a cartridge-based system for the categories and wireless remotes for the players and the host, with the unit itself acting as the scoreboard. There was also a small laptop-style keyboard that connected to the game unit and allowed for programming the cartridges via a small LCD screen on the unit. The uprated version of the system replaced the LCD screen and keyboard with a USB-connected device known as the "Classroom Jeopardy! Link," which allowed programming of the cartridges (and storage of unused games) via a PC or Macintosh (which included "Classroom Jeopardy! Editor" software).

The success of Classroom Jeopardy! led to the production of a home version, called Host Your Own Jeopardy!, which was released in 2004. Except for the names and included question content, this version was identical to the Classroom version. The Classroom edition featured one cartridge with 5 pre-programmed school-subject-based games; while the Host Your Own edition included four cartridges featuring 20 games used on the show, ranging from Kids Week level to Tournament Of Champions level. Educational Insights also produced additional scoreboards and controller units that could be connected to the main system and allow for more players per game (a maximum of nine additional scoreboards could be added, making for a maximum of 30 players/teams per game, although only the six highest-scoring players/teams could participate in Final Jeopardy!).

In 2011, Educational Insights released an updated version of the Classroom Jeopardy! system. The updated system featured a restyling of the console and remotes, dry-erase Final Jeopardy! boards, and a host remote with LCD "correct response" display. Additional functions included the ability to enter players' names into the console, and more varied wagers for Daily Doubles and Final Jeopardy! Additionally, this system used USB Flash Drives in place of the cartridges to program the console (the system included a 512K Flash Drive, but other larger Flash Drives could also be used). This also makes the updated system capable of using audiovisual clues (such as audio and video clips, music cues, and still images), properly-formatted math equation clues, and foreign "romance language" characters. The new system is not backward-compatible with the older cartridges and accessories, but games written with the older system's software can be easily converted via the new system's "Clue Studio" program. The entirety of the new system also fits into an included storage suitcase, allowing for easier transport of the unit. Both editions of the game were available after the release of the newer model, but since then, both have been discontinued. The websites for purchase have since gone down.

Other merchandise 
A DVD titled Jeopardy!: An Inside Look at America's Favorite Quiz Show was released on November 8, 2005 by Sony Pictures Home Entertainment. It features five of the most memorable episodes of the Trebek version: the very first Trebek episode in 1984, Episode #4657 (Ken Jennings' losing episode), and Episodes #4781, #4782, and #4783 (the three-game finals of the Ultimate Tournament of Champions, the last of which can be viewed through multiple camera angles), and there are also three featurettes: 21 Years of Answers and Questions, which discusses the show's history; and Jeopardy!: Behind the Answers and What Does It Take to Get a Clue?, both of which discuss the show's question selection process. The DVD also features some funny moments from the show, including Trebek presenting the beginning of the first show of the Ultimate Tournament of Champions Finals without trousers, and Johnny Gilbert mistaking Trebek for contestant coordinator Glenn Kagan, who rehearses as him; both of these are Easter eggs displayed as the show's trademark "Daily Doubles". The DVD's menu is displayed as the show's trademark game board, with the menu options as "categories"; picking one of these causes the board to load up, complete with sound effect, similar to the show.

In 2007, MGA Entertainment released the Jeopardy! DVD Home Game System, which allows groups of players to play the game of Jeopardy! from home with a similar experience to appearing on the actual show.

For the show's 15th anniversary season in 1998–99, a collectible watch was released. It plays the show's theme song, "Think!", with a push of a button, and includes 25 game cards with the answer-question format. Despite poor sales, several watches are currently being auctioned and sold on eBay as of today.

Every year, Day-to-Day Calendars' subsidiary Andrews McMeel Publishing releases a daily desktop Jeopardy! calendar, featuring 52 games for every week of the year, all of which have 1 clue per day (with the correct response on the back of each day's sheet). Entries for Monday through Wednesday are Jeopardy! Round Clues, those for Thursday through Saturday are Double Jeopardy! Round clues, and Sunday's entry is a Final Jeopardy! clue which allows the owner to "wager" all or part of their "total weekly winnings."

The brand has also been licensed into various slot machine games for casinos and the Internet.

International versions
The popularity of Jeopardy! in the United States has led the show's format to launch in many foreign countries throughout the world. This has led the American version to conduct "International Tournaments" in which champions from the show's foreign adaptations competed in a one-week tournament identical to the semifinals and finals of the American version's "Tournament of Champions".

Most versions are faithful to the American version's format, but some use unique formats of their own; for example, the Czech, Slovak and Italian adaptations eschew the show's trademark "answer and question" format in favor of a simple, standard quiz format, where clues are presented as questions or tasks and the contestants simply answer the questions or perform the tasks indicated, rather than providing responses phrased in the form of a question.

Canadian broadcasting of the show
Even though the program has spawned many foreign adaptations, the American syndicated version of Jeopardy! is itself broadcast across the world, with international distribution rights held by CBS Studios International.

In Canada, Jeopardy! had aired largely on local stations since its debut. Like most American game shows that air in Canada, Canadians are eligible to appear as contestants on the American version, with notable examples including 1990 Tournament of Champions winner Bob Blake and 1997 International Jeopardy! Tournament winner Michael Daunt. Before 2008, Jeopardy! aired across Canada mostly on CTV stations, although the Vancouver CTV station CIVT-TV has never aired the show (the show has aired before on local Global station CHAN-TV).

From 2008 to 2012, the show was broadcast by all affiliates of CBC Television except for CBET-DT in Windsor, Ontario (due to broadcast rights in that region being held by WDIV-TV in Detroit). Funding decreases to CBC led to the network declining to renew Jeopardy! and Wheel for the 2012–13 season.

As of 2018, Yes TV currently serves as Canada's syndicator for Jeopardy! episodes. NTV, a Newfoundland-based semi-independent television station, has carried the show through its run on CTV and Yes TV.

In French Canada, just as Wheel of Fortune once had its own French-Canadian version, there was also a French-Canadian version of Jeopardy! that aired for a few seasons in Quebec, on TVA, from 1991 to 1993.

References

External links
 Jeopardy! official website
 Classroom Jeopardy! official website
 An authorized dealer for the Classroom Jeopardy! Game System

Game.com games
 
Television franchises
Video games based on game shows
Television shows remade overseas
Non-American television series based on American television series
Sony Pictures video games